The Regiment "Lancieri di Montebello" (8th) ( - "Lancers of Montebello") is a cavalry unit of the Italian Army based in Rome. The regiment is the reconnaissance unit of the Mechanized Brigade "Granatieri di Sardegna" and performs public duties in Rome.

History

Formation 
After the Second Italian War of Independence the Royal Sardinian Army formed three new Chevau-légers regiments on 16 September 1859: Regiment "Cavalleggeri di Milano", Regiment "Cavalleggeri di Montebello", and Regiment "Cavalleggeri di Lodi". The "Cavalleggeri di Montebello" was formed in Voghera, with three squadrons transferred from the Regiment "Cavalleggeri di Novara", Regiment "Cavalleggeri di Aosta", and Regiment "Cavalleggeri di Monferrato". The three regiments had distinguished themselves in the Battle of Montebello four months earlier, making the "Lancieri di Montebello" the only Italian Army cavalry regiment named after a battle.

On 6 June 1860 the regiment was reorganized as a lancer regiment and renamed Regiment "Lancieri di Montebello". In 1861-63 the regiment operated in the Capitanata area to suppress the anti-Sardinian revolt in Southern Italy after the Kingdom of Sardinia had invaded and annexed the Kingdom of Two Sicilies. In 1866 the regiment participated in the Third Italian War of Independence. Over the next years the regiment repeatedly changed its name:

 10 September 1871: 8th Regiment of Cavalry (Montebello)
 5 November 1876: Cavalry Regiment "Montebello" (8th)
 16 December 1897: Regiment "Lancieri di Montebello" (8th)

In 1887 the regiment contributed to the formation of the Mounted Hunters Squadron, which fought in the Italo-Ethiopian War of 1887–1889. In 1895-96 the regiment provided 1 officer and 69 enlisted for units deployed to Italian Eritrea for the First Italo-Ethiopian War. In 1911-12 the regiment provided 91 enlisted personnel to augment units fighting in the Italo-Turkish War. On 1 October 1909 the Montebello ceded one of its squadrons to help form new Regiment "Lancieri di Vercelli" (26th).

World War I 
At the outbreak of World War I the regiment consisted of a command, the regimental depot, and two cavalry groups, with the I Group consisting of three squadrons and the II Group consisting of two squadrons and a machine gun section. Together with the Regiment "Savoia Cavalleria" (3rd) the Montebello formed the VI Cavalry Brigade of the 3rd Cavalry Division of "Lombardy". The division fought dismounted in the trenches of the Italian Front. In 1917 the regimental depot in Parma formed the 860th Dismounted Machine Gunners Company as reinforcement for infantry units on the front.

Interwar years 
After the war the Italian Army disbanded 14 of its 30 cavalry regiments and so on 21 November 1919 the II Group of the Montebello was renamed "Cavalleggeri di Catania" as it consisted of personnel and horses from the disbanded Regiment "Cavalleggeri di Catania" (22nd). On 20 May 1920 the regiment was disbanded and one its squadrons was transferred to the Regiment "Nizza Cavalleria" (1st), while the II Group "Cavalleggeri di Catania" was transferred to the Regiment "Lancieri Vittorio Emanuele II" (10th). The traditions of the "Lancieri di Montebello" were assigned to the Regiment "Nizza Cavalleria" (1st).

World War II 
On 15 July 1942 the Armored Reconnaissance Grouping "Lancieri di Montebello" (8th) ( (R.E.Co) "Lancieri di Montebello" (8°)) was formed in Ferrara by the depot of the Regiment "Lancieri di Firenze" (9th). On 19 July 1942 the Montebello was assigned to the 134th Armored Division "Emanuele Filiberto Testa di Ferro", but already on 1 August 1942 the regiment was assigned to the Armored and Motorized Troops Inspectorate. On 1 April 1943 the regiment was assigned to the 135th Armored Cavalry Division "Ariete". By September 1943 the grouping consisted of the following units:

 Armored Reconnaissance Grouping "Lancieri di Montebello" (8th)
 Command Squadron
 I Squadrons Group
 Command Squadron (4x AB41 armored cars)
 1st Squadron (17x AB41 armored cars)
 2nd Squadron (17x AB41 armored cars)
 3rd Motorcyclists Squadron
 II Squadrons Group
 Command Squadron (4x Semovente 47/32 L40 self-propelled guns)
 4th Motorcyclists Squadron
 5th Squadron (12x Semovente 75/18 M42 self-propelled guns)
 6th Squadron (12x Semovente 47/32 L40 self-propelled guns)
 III Squadrons Group (formed in summer 1943)
 Command Squadron (4x M15/42 tanks)
 7th Squadron (17x M15/42 tanks)
 8th Squadron (16x L6/40 tanks)
 9th Anti-aircraft Squadron (12x 20/65 Mod. 35 anti-aircraft guns)

After the announcement of the Armistice of Cassibile on 8 September 1943 the grouping, together with the 12th Infantry Division "Sassari", 21st Infantry Division "Granatieri di Sardegna", and 135th Armored Cavalry Division "Ariete" defended Rome against invading German forces. On 10 September the Granatieri, Lancieri di Montebello, remnants of the Sassari and hundreds of civilians fell back to Porta San Paolo for a last stand. By 17:00 the Germans broke the line of the Italian defenders, who had suffered 570 dead, including two of the Montebello's squadrons commanders: Captain Romolo Fugazza and Captain Camillo Sabatini. Soon after the units surrendered to the Germans as the flight of the Italian King Victor Emmanuel III from Rome made further resistance senseless. The grouping was declared lost due to wartime events on 16 September 1943.

For their role in the defence of the Rome the 1st Regiment "Granatieri di Sardegna" and the "Lancieri di Montebello" were each awarded a Silver Medal of Military Valour.

Cold War 
On 1 January 1950 the Armored Cavalry Squadron "Lancieri di Montebello" was formed in Rome and equipped with M8 Greyhound armored cars. On 1 May 1951 the squadron was expanded to 8th Armored Cavalry Regiment "Lancieri di Montebello" and consisted of a command, a command squadron, and three squadrons groups equipped with M47 Patton tanks. On 4 November 1958 the regiment was renamed Regiment "Lancieri di Montebello" (8th).

During the 1975 army reform the army disbanded the regimental level and newly independent battalions were granted for the first time their own flags. On 30 September 1975 the Regiment "Lancieri di Montebello" (8th) and its II and III squadrons groups were disbanded. On 1 October the regiment's I Squadrons Group was reorganized and renamed 8th Armored Squadrons Group "Lancieri di Montebello" and assigned the flag and traditions of the regiment. The squadrons group consisted of a command, a command and services squadron, two tank squadrons with M47 Patton tanks, and one mechanized squadron with M113 armored personnel carriers.

On 1 July 1979 the squadrons group was reorganized as 8th Mechanized Squadrons Group "Lancieri di Montebello" and now consisted of a command, a command and services squadron, three mechanized squadrons with M113 armored personnel carriers, and a heavy mortar squadron with M106 mortar carriers with 120mm mod. 63 mortars.

Recent times 
On 22 September 1992 the 8th Mechanized Squadrons Group "Lancieri di Montebello" lost its autonomy and the next day the squadrons group entered the newly formed Regiment "Lancieri di Montebello" (8th). The regiment consisted of a command, a command and services squadron, and a squadrons group with three armored squadrons equipped with wheeled Centauro tank destroyers.

With the army reform of 1997 the regiment joined the Mechanized Brigade "Granatieri di Sardegna" as the brigade's reconnaissance unit. In March 2004 the regiment raised the Horse Squadrons Group to perform mounted public duties in Rome.

Today the regiment is the reconnaissance unit of the Mechanized Brigade "Granatieri di Sardegna" and the army's mounted public duties unit.

Current structure 
As of 2022 the Regiment "Lancieri di Montebello" (8th) consists of:

  Regimental Command, in Rome
 Military Equestrian Center
 Command and Logistic Support Squadron
 1st Reconnaissance Squadrons Group
 1st Reconnaissance Squadron
 2nd Reconnaissance Squadron
 3rd Reconnaissance Squadron
 Heavy Armored Squadron
 Horse Squadrons Group
 1st Mounted Squadron
 2nd Mounted Squadron

The Command and Logistic Support Squadron fields the following platoons: C3 Platoon, Transport and Materiel Platoon, Medical Platoon, and Commissariat Platoon. The three reconnaissance squadrons are equipped with VTLM Lince vehicles and Centauro tank destroyers, the latter of which are scheduled to be replaced by Freccia reconnaissance vehicles. The Heavy Armor Squadron is equipped with Centauro tank destroyers, which are being replaced by Centauro II tank destroyers.

See also 
 Mechanized Brigade "Granatieri di Sardegna"

External links
 Italian Army Website: Reggimento "Lancieri di Montebello" (8°)

References

Cavalry Regiments of Italy